The 1966 Swedish speedway season was the 1966 season of motorcycle speedway in Sweden.

Individual

Individual Championship
The 1966 Swedish Individual Speedway Championship final was held on 7 October in Stockholm. Ove Fundin won the Swedish Championship for the sixth time.

The final ended with five riders tied on 12 points, Fundin won the race-off.

Junior Championship
 
Winner - Egon Stengarn

Team

Team Championship
Getingarna continued their recent domination by winning division 1 again and being declared the winners of the Swedish Speedway Team Championship for the fourth consecutive season. The Getingarna team contained Göte Nordin, Leif Larsson, Bengt Jansson and Arne Carlsson.

The league consisted of 14 teams (down from 19) resulting in only three divisions. Njudungarna won the second division and Indianerna won the third division.

See also 
 Speedway in Sweden

References

Speedway leagues
Professional sports leagues in Sweden
Swedish
Seasons in Swedish speedway